Prasoon Pandey (born 1961), is an Indian director of advertising films. Advertising Age listed him among the Top 100 advertising film directors of the world. Gunn Report ranked him at No. 24 in a list of the best and most awarded ad film directors in 2001. His One Black Coffee ad for Ericsson was the first Indian commercial to win at Cannes.

Having finished his studies at National Institute of Design, he worked as agency creative director at advertising agency Lintas before turning spot director after a client had asked him to direct a particular film himself.

Prasoon Pandey is currently the director of his own production house venture, Corcoise Films, in Mumbai. His brother Piyush Pandey is an equally famous Indian advertising personality and sister Ila Arun a famous singer.

External links
 

1961 births
Indian advertising directors
Indian male screenwriters
Living people
National Institute of Design alumni
Television commercial directors